Elaeocarpus griffithii is a tree in the family Elaeocarpaceae. It is found in parts of Island and Mainland Southeast Asia. It is used in construction, as firewood and in dyeing.

Description
It has smooth bark, and grows 10-25m tall in dense and flooded forests.

Distribution
The tree is found in Borneo, Sumatera, Peninsular Malaysia, Thailand, Cambodia, Vietnam, Laos and Myanmar.

Habitat
The tree occurs in ombrotrophic (rain-fed) coastal peat swamp forest in Kubu Raya Regency, and in the ombrotrophic peatland forest of Berasap and Tulak in the Ketapang Regency, of West Kalimantan, Indonesia.
In the southernmost province of Thailand, Narathiwat, within the To Daeng peat swamp forest, Elaeocarpus griffithii is found among the primary forest, but not the secondary formations.
The species grows in choams (Khmer, permanently inundated evergreen swamp forests) of northern Stung Treng Province, Cambodia, occurring in both seasonally and permanently inundated areas.
The species is one of most common species of tree in the wetland swamp forests of the Mekong floodplain of southern Vietnam, along with Barringtonia acutangula, Diospyros cambodiana, Elaeocarpus hygrophilus, Hydnocarpus castaneus, and Mallotus plicatus.

Ecology
While investigating the effects of forest degradation (clearfelling and other old-growth forest reduction) on the peatland forest of Berasap and Tulak in the Ketapang Regency of West Kalimantan, Astiani showed increasingly reduced density of Elaeocarpus griffithii as degradation increased. In another study looking at waterflow from trees to the soil, conducted in coastal peat swamp forest of Kubu Raya Regency, West Kalimantan, Elaeocarpus griffithii was found to have high stemflow down to the soil. This is consistent with other smooth-barked taxa, as opposed to coarse- and mid-barked taxa.

Vernacular names
The plant is named in various ways in a number of languages: mempening (Kabu Raya Regency, Kalimantan), luët chum, rumdé:nh phluk, chorm nhi (Khmer); côm tầng, côm griffith (Vietnamese)

Uses
The wood is used in construction and as firewood in Cambodia, and in construction as well as a source of tannin for dyeing in Vietnam.

History
The species was first described by the eminent US botanist Asa Gray in his 1854 publication within the official report of the Wilkes Expedition (1838–42) of the Pacific and surrounding lands.

Further reading
Additional information on this plant can be found in the following:
Govaerts, R. (2001). World Checklist of Seed Plants Database in ACCESS E-F: 1–50919.
Kiew, R. & al. (eds.) (2018). Flora of peninsular Malaysia. Series II: Seed Plants. volume 7 Malayan Forest Records 49: 1–321.
Kress, W.J., DeFilipps, R.A., Farr, E. & Kyi, D.Y.Y. (2003). A Checklist of the Trees, Shrubs, Herbs and Climbers of Myanmar Contributions from the United States National Herbarium 45: 1–590. Smithsonian Institution.
Lê, T.C. (2005). Danh lục các loài thục vật Việt Nam [Checklist of Plant Species of Vietnam] 3: 1–1248. Hà Noi : Nhà xu?t b?n Nông nghi?p.
Nguyễn Tiến Bân, Nguyễn Quốc Bình, Vũ Văn Cẩn, Lê Mộng Chân, Nguyễn Ngọc Chính, Vũ Văn Dũng, Nguyễn Văn Dư, Trần Đình Đại, Nguyễn Kim Đào, Nguyễn Thị Đỏ, Nguyễn Hữu Hiến, Nguyễn Đình Hưng, Dương Đức Huyến, Nguyễn Đăng Khôi, Nguyễn Khắc Khôi, Trần Kim Liên, Vũ Xuân Phương, Hoàng Thị Sản, Nguyễn Văn Tập, Nguyễn Nghĩa Thìn; Tên cây rừng Việt Nam [Name of Vietnamese forest trees] ; Nhà xuất bản Nông nghiệp - 2000; page 47.
Phạm Hoàng Hộ; Cây cỏ Việt Nam [Vietnamese plants] - tập 1; Nhà xuất bản Trẻ - 1999; page 475

References

griffithii
Flora of Borneo
Flora of Indo-China
Flora of Peninsular Malaysia
Flora of Sumatra
Plants described in 1854